The Valea Pietrei or Netiș is a left tributary of the Râul Mare in Romania. It flows into the Râul Mare downstream from the Gura Apelor Dam.

References

Rivers of Romania
Rivers of Hunedoara County